Out There is the first live album by Dar Williams.

Track listing
All songs by Dar Williams, except as noted.
 "As Cool as I Am" 3:47
 "If I Wrote You"	 4:05
 "Spring Street" 	5:00
 "I Won't Be Your Yoko Ono Intro" 2:13
 "I Won't Be Your Yoko Ono" 3:37
 "February" 3:57
 "The Ocean" 5:20
 "Better Things"	(Ray Davies) 3:02
 "Iowa" 5:32
 "End of the Summer" 4:26
 "We Learned the Sea" 2:47
 "Are You Out There Intro"	 0:21
 "Are You Out There" 3:02
 "When I Was a Boy" 5:06
 "What Do You Hear in These Sounds" 4:10
 "After All"	 4:49
 "The Babysitter's Here Intro" 1:43
 "The Babysitter's Here" 4:18
 "Christians and Pagans" 3:31

Personnel
Dar Williams - vocals, guitar
Steuart Smith – guitar, keyboards, background vocals
Jeff Kazee – keyboards, background vocals
Gail Ann Dorsey – bass guitar, background vocals
Steve Holley – drums, percussion, background vocals

References 

Dar Williams albums
2001 live albums
Razor & Tie live albums